Shaikh Pasha Habib Uddin OSP,  SGP, BAMS, afwc, psc is a two-star rank Bangladesh Army officer and the current director general of the Bangladesh Institute of International and Strategic Studies (BIISS). Prior to join BIISS, he was senior directing staff at the National Defense College. Earlier, he was commandant, Bangladesh Ordnance Factories (BOF) and the director general of Bangladesh Ansar and Village Defence Party. He also served as the chairman of Ansar-VDP Unnayan Bank.

Early life and education
Habib Uddin was born on 20 November 1967 in Feni, Pakistan. He graduated from Faujdarhat Cadet College and joined the 16th long course of the Bangladesh Military Academy. He was commissioned in the Bangladesh Army on 26 June 1987. He completed his undergraduate from the University of Chittagong and an MBA from the IBA, University of Dhaka. He completed a master's in war studies and another in defence studies from the National University of Bangladesh. He attended the National Defence College and the Defence Services Command and Staff College. In 2006, he completed a course on civic response to terrorism at the United States Navy operated Naval Postgraduate School in California. He completed a leadership course at the United States Military Academy.

Career
Habib Uddin served as the defence attache in the Bangladesh embassy in the United Kingdom. He commanded the second artillery brigade. He was deputed to the Border Guards Bangladesh where he served as the commander of the 1st Battalion. He was an instructor in the School of Infantry and Tactics. He commanded a Bangladeshi United Nation Peacekeeping contingent. He commanded a mechanized infantry unit in the United Nations Operation in Côte d'Ivoire. He served in the Directorate General of Forces Intelligence. He was made the director general of Bangladesh Ansar and the Village Defence Party on 31 April 2017. On 6 January 2018, he announced that 600,000 personnel of Bangladesh Ansar and the Village Defence Party will be deployed in the next general election of Bangladesh.

References

Living people
Bangladesh Army generals
Bangladesh Ansar
People from Feni District
1967 births
Faujdarhat Cadet College alumni
National Defence College (Bangladesh) alumni